Valmir Carlos da Assunção (born 17 December 1964) more commonly known as Valmir Assunção is a Brazilian politician and farmer. He has spent his political career representing his home state of Bahia, having served as state representative since 2011.

Personal life
He is the child of Ionério Carlos da Assunção and Rosa Francisco Dias Assunção. Assunção is married to Fabya Reis. Before becoming a politician Assunção worked as an agriculturalists. He has been affiliated with the Landless Workers' Movement since 1990.

Political career
Assunção voted against the impeachment motion of then-president Dilma Rousseff. Assunção voted against the 2017 Brazilian labor reform, and would vote in favor of a corruption investigation into Rousseff's successor Michel Temer.

During the impeachment proceedings against Rousseff, Assunção got in a heated argument with Laerte Bessa about Eduardo Cunha's proposal of a secret ballot to see if the impeachment motion should proceed. Assunção and Bessa started shouting loudly at each other which quickly turned to pushing and shoving with soon escalated with other members of parliament involved. Assunção and Bessa were ultimately disciplined and not allowed to attend the rest of the hearing, although they were ultimately allowed to vote in proceeding.

References

1964 births
Living people
Brazilian farmers
Workers' Party (Brazil) politicians
Members of the Chamber of Deputies (Brazil) from Bahia
Members of the Legislative Assembly of Bahia
People from Bahia
Brazilian politicians of African descent